Dolphin Island is a 2021 English family drama film directed by Mike Disa. The film follows an orphan teenager and her pet dolphin.

Plot
After losing her parents, 14-year-old Annabel Coleridge  lives with her fisherman grandfather, Jonah Coleridge, on an island paradise. Having lost her parents at the age of 5, Annabel's best friend is the local town dolphin named Mitzy. Annabel helps her grandfather on his fishing boat and in his shop when she's not at school.

All that changes when Samuel  and Sheryl Williams, Annabel's maternal grandparents, show up with their lawyer, Robert Carbunkle. They live in New York and want to take custody of Annabel, giving her the life she never had or could afford.

When Desaray Rolle, a social worker, moves to the island with her 13 year old son, Mateo, romance is soon in the air for both Jonah and Annabel. However, Desaray's initial report of Annabel's living conditions threatens to pull everyone apart when Carbunkle gets his hands on it.

Although Jonah tries hard to explain his care for Annabel, at a court hearing, the judge awards temporary custody to Samuel and Sheryl Williams.

But before Annabel is forced to leave, she runs away and steals a speed boat. The whole town is looking for Annabel, proving to the Williams how much they love her and provide Annabel a caring home. Unfortunately, the boat Annabel stole was in repair and caught in fire. It is up to Mitzy to get her help and bring Annabel to safety.

Cast
Peter Woodward as Jonah Coleridge
 Tyler Jade Nixon as Annabel Coleridge
 Dionne Lea Williams as Desaray Rolle
 Bob Bledsoe as Robert Carbunkle
 Aaron Burrows as Mateo Rolle
 Annette Lovrien Duncan as Sheryl Williams
 David Raizor as Samuel Williams

Reception
The film has received positive reviews and approved for all ages by The Dove Foundation, which called Dolphin Island "a heartwarming tale of love and accountability, will be entertaining for the whole family." Bradley Gibson of Film Threat gave a positive review, calling the film "an escapist fantasy kids movie with beautiful Caribbean island scenery. It serves as light entertainment with a message." The Coalition for Quality Children's Media, Kids First, gave Dolphin Island 5 out of 5 stars and "recommend it for ages 7 to 18, plus adults. It is definitely family friendly and highlights the importance of family. Anna sets a good example of a child who is caring and loving." The film was embraced by the Christian film industry, winning Best Feature Film at the Christian Film Festival.

Release
On March 2, 2021, the film was released on demand by Entertainment Squad.

References

External links
 
 

2021 films
Films about dolphins
2020s English-language films